Konstantin Mirovich Kozeyev is a retired Russian cosmonaut.

Early life and career
Kozeyev was born in Korolyov, Moscow Oblast, Russian SFSR on December 1, 1967. He is a graduate student from Moscow Aviation Technology Institute and was selected as a cosmonaut on February 9, 1996. He flew as Flight Engineer on Soyuz TM-33 in 2001.

Personal life
Kozeyev is divorced and has no children.

References

1967 births
Living people
Moscow Aviation Institute alumni
People from Korolyov, Moscow Oblast
Russian cosmonauts
Heroes of the Russian Federation